Mondulkiri is one of the 6 constituencies of the National Assembly of Cambodia. It is allocated 1 seat in the National Assembly.

MPs

References

Parliamentary constituencies in Cambodia
1993 establishments in Cambodia
Constituencies established in 1993